Hillsborough Bay is a  bay on the south shore of Prince Edward Island, Canada and is a sub-basin of the Northumberland Strait.

Description
Hillsborough Bay is the largest bay in terms of surface area in Prince Edward Island, followed by Malpeque Bay.  Its southerly limits are Rice Point in the west and Point Prim in the east.  It opens directly south and west onto the Northumberland Strait while its northern and eastern shores are formed by Prince Edward Island; the Point Prim peninsula also extends along its southeastern boundary.  The bay is notable for the entrance to Charlottetown Harbour along its northern shore, which is formed by the tidal estuaries of the Hillsborough (East) River, North (Yorke) River, and the West (Elliott) River.

Islands
Hillsborough Bay has several islands located within the bay:

 Governors Island
 St. Peters Island
 Cameron's Island
 Judson Island
 Christie Island

Sub-basins
Hillsborough Bay has several sub-basins:

 Charlottetown Harbour, formed by the tidal estuaries of the Hillsborough (East) River, North (Yorke) River, and the West (Elliott) River
 Pownal Bay
 Orwell Bay, fed by the tidal estuary of the Vernon River and Orwell River

Marine and wildlife
Hillsborough Bay is home to large nesting colonies of herons and cormorants and is a nursery area for fin and shell fishes.  A colony of  harbor seals is located on Governors Island.

Recreation
The bay supports several recreational areas, primarily at Port-la-Joye–Fort Amherst National Historic Site and Tea Hill Park in the town of Stratford.  There are several beaches along the bay's shoreline that are suitable for swimming, notably Keppoch Beach and Kinlock Beach in Stratford.

Communities
The town of Stratford is the largest population centre directly fronting the bay. The following communities are located along the bay's shoreline from west to east:

 Rice Point
 Nine Mile Creek
 Cumberland
 Rocky Point
 Stratford
 Alexandra
 Pownal
 Waterside
 Mount Mellick
 Cherry Valley
 Earnscliffe
 Vernon Bridge
 Orwell
 Orwell Cove
 Lower Newtown
 Eldon
 Mount Buchanan
 Point Prim

References

Bays of Prince Edward Island
Geography of Queens County, Prince Edward Island